Dubai Air Wing is the paramilitary airline of the government of the United Arab Emirates.

The airline is used by the Emir of Dubai, the prime minister of the United Arab Emirates, as well as government officials.

The airline provided Emirates with their first aircraft but are not affiliated beyond both having ties with the government of Dubai.

Its main base is in the southeastern corner of the Dubai International Airport.

Fleet

Current fleet

The Dubai Air Wing fleet consists of the following aircraft (as of February 2019):

Historic fleet
The airline fleet previously included the following aircraft:

References

External links

Dubai Air Wing Fleet 

Airlines of the United Arab Emirates
Government-owned companies of the United Arab Emirates
Air transport of heads of state
Government-owned airlines
Royal vehicles